Defrocked and Kicking the Habit is the second LP by Soltero. It was recorded in Shutesbury, MA by Ben Sterling and Somerville, MA by Steve Mayone. As with Soltero's first record, it features the Mobius Band amongst others. It was released in April 2003.

Track listing 
All tracks by Tim Howard

 "I'll Be a Writer" – 3:39
 "Fight Song for True Love" – 3:24
 "On the Ropes" – 4:40
 "Digging" – 4:27
 "Autobahn" – 5:05
 "Boys of Brighton" – 4:09
 "Vaporetto" – 3:07
 "The Moment You Said Yes" – 4:48
 "Paradise City" – 5:30
 "I See It Now" – 4:11
 "Sinking Ship" – 3:38

Personnel 

Alex Braden – accordion
Jeff Breeze – vox organ
Tim Howard – banjo, guitar, vox organ, toy instruments
Thomas Hummel – horn
Casey Keenan – drums
Steve Mayone – guitar, drums, bass, engineer
Peter Sax – bass, vox organ
Tim Shea – engineer
Ben Sterling – engineer, mastering
Bernard Sterling – assistant

References

2003 albums
Soltero albums